On the Point of Death is a 1971 Italian drama film directed by Mario Garriba. The film won the Golden Leopard at the Locarno International Film Festival.

Cast
 Fabio Garriba
 Jobst Grapow
 Lidija Juracik
 Maria Marchi
 Gabriella Minciotti

References

External links
 

1971 films
1971 drama films
Italian drama films
1970s Italian-language films
Golden Leopard winners
1970s Italian films